Chepra Cove (‘Zaliv Chepra’ \'za-liv che-'pra\) is the 1.7 km wide cove indenting for 2.3 km the west coast of Pernik Peninsula on Loubet Coast in Graham Land, Antarctica.  It is a part of Lallemand Fjord entered south of Holdfast Point, and has its head fed by Koriten Glacier.

The cove is named after the cave of Chepra in Southeastern Bulgaria.

Location
British mapping in 1976.

Maps
 Antarctic Digital Database (ADD). Scale 1:250000 topographic map of Antarctica. Scientific Committee on Antarctic Research (SCAR). Since 1993, regularly upgraded and updated.
British Antarctic Territory. Scale 1:200000 topographic map. DOS 610 Series, Sheet W 66 66. Directorate of Overseas Surveys, Tolworth, UK, 1976.

References
 Bulgarian Antarctic Gazetteer. Antarctic Place-names Commission. (details in Bulgarian, basic data in English)
Chepra Cove. SCAR Composite Antarctic Gazetteer.

External links
 Chepra Cove. Copernix satellite image

Coves of Graham Land
Bulgaria and the Antarctic
Loubet Coast